The Dyason's Klip 1 Power Station, (also Dyasons Klip 1 Power Station), is an 86 megawatts solar power plant in South Africa. The power station was developed and is owned and operated by a consortium comprising an international independent power producer (IPP), South African and European investors and a local charitable trust. Commercially commissioned in February 2020, the solar farm's 217 GWh of energy production annually is sold to Eskom, the national electricity utility company, under a long-term power purchase agreement (PPA).

Location
The solar farm is located in the settlement of Dyasons Klip in Dawid Kruiper Municipality (ZF Mgcawu District), Northern Cape Province. The geographical coordinates of the Dyasons Klip 1 solar farm are:28°34'15.0"S, 21°03'52.0"E (Latitude:-28.570833; Longitude:21.064444).

Overview
The lead developer in Dyasons Klip 1 power plant is the Norwegian IPP, Scatec Solar, which has interests in two other solar farms in the Upington Solar Complex. The other two are (a) Sirius 1 Solar Power Station (86 MW), that was commissioned in February 2020 and (b) the 86 MW Dyason's Klip 2 Power Station under development. The three solar power plants, with a cumulative generation capacity of 258 MW are part of South Africa's Renewable Energy Independent Power Producer Procurement Programme (REIPPP).

The power station comprises 277,500 modules each rated at 310 Watts, supplied by BYD of China. It also contains 37 Sunny Central 2200   inverters manufactured by SMA Solar Technology of Germany.

Developers
The consortium that owns this power station has four shareholders as illustrated in the table below. For descriptive purposes we will call the special purpose vehicle company that owns and operates the solar farm Dyasons Klip 1 Solar Consortium.

Change in ownership
In February 2023, Scatec Solar and Norfund, both of Norway divested from the 258 megawatts Upington Solar Complex, comprising Dyasons Klip 1 Solar Power Station, Dyasons Klip 2 Solar Power Station and Sirius 1 Solar Power Station. Their combined 60 percent shareholding in each of these solar farms was purchased by Stanlib Asset Management Proprietary, "an asset manager based in Johannesburg, South Africa". The deal requires South African regulatory approval.

Construction costs
The cost of construction is reported as US$140.75 million.

See also

List of power stations in South Africa

References

External links
 Another 86 MW of Scatec Solar’s 258 MW solar power complex in South Africa in commercial operation  As of 25 February 2020.
 Dyason’s Klip 1 solar photovoltaic project, South Africa As of 12 February 2016.

Solar power stations in South Africa
Economy of the Northern Cape
Energy infrastructure completed in 2020
2020 establishments in South Africa
Buildings and structures in South Africa
Dawid Kruiper Local Municipality
21st-century architecture in South Africa